Lomes is a parish (administrative division) in Allande, a municipality within the province and autonomous community of Asturias, in northern Spain. 

The population is 105. The postal code is 33890.

Villages and hamlets
 Carcedo de Lomes ("Carcéu")
 Lomes ("Ḷḷomes")
 Otero ("L'Outeiru")
 Tarallé ("Taraé")

The parish church, dedicated to Saint James the Greater, was built in the 15th century.

References

External links
 Allande 

Parishes in Allande